Fabian Schnaidt (born 27 October 1990) is a German former road bicycle racer, who rode competitively between 2010 and 2014 for Team Bergstrasse, Team Specialized Concept Store, and .

Major results
Source:

2006
 2nd National Novice Team Pursuit Championships
2010
 2nd LBS Cup Reute
 2nd Grosser Silber-Pils Preiss
 3rd Baden-Württembergische Strassenmeisterschaften
2011
 1st  National Under-23 Road Race Championships
 1st Cottbus–Görlitz–Cottbus
 4th Antwerpse Havenpijl
 8th Eschborn-Frankfurt City Loop U23
2012
 1st Stage 6 La Tropicale Amissa Bongo
 1st Stage 2 Oberösterreichrundfahrt
 1st Stage 1 Tour of Qinghai Lake
 8th ProRace Berlin
2014
 Tour of Iran
1st Stages 1 & 6
 1st Stage 5 Tour de Taiwan
 1st Stage 2 Paris–Arras Tour
 2nd Banja Luka–Belgrad I
 3rd GP Izola
 8th Rutland–Melton International CiCLE Classic

References

External links

1990 births
Living people
German male cyclists
Place of birth missing (living people)
Tour of Azerbaijan (Iran) winners
People from Zollernalbkreis
Sportspeople from Tübingen (region)
Cyclists from Baden-Württemberg